Summula may refer to :

 a Summa, text that 'sums up' knowledge in a field, e.g. the compendiums of theology, philosophy and canon law which served as medieval textbooks in schools and books of reference 
 Summula, Mauretania, Ancient city and bishopric in Roman Africa, now a Latin Catholic titular see